Everything I Long For is the debut album by Canadian singer-songwriter Hayden.  It was initially released in Canada on Hardwood Records. It was later re-released in 1996 (with slightly modified cover art) on Sonic Unyon, and internationally on Outpost Recordings/Geffen Records. A 12" vinyl version was also released in 1996 on Hardwood/Genius Records.

The song "Assignment in Space with Rip Foster" is an alternative title to the children's novel Rip Foster Rides the Gray Planet by Harold L. Goodwin. Assignment in Space with Rip Foster is also attributed in the liner notes of Hayden's debut album, In September, as the recording studio where he recorded part of that album.

Bad as They Seem 
The song "Bad as They Seem" was released as a single, and the music video received some play on MuchMusic and MTV's 120 Minutes. The lyrics are from the point of view of a young twenty-something man in a hopeless situation: working a dead-end job ("where [he worked] at fourteen"), still living at his parents' home ("until [he's] at least forty-three"), infatuated with a 16-year-old "girl of [his] dreams", and possibly infatuated with the girl's mother, as well. The man wishes for a life where he can go out and meet someone to be his "better half". The hopeless and depressing nature of the song is reiterated with each verse, which states that "things are as bad as they seem". The third verse of the song ("Job of my dreams…") is absent from the album's reissues.

Track listing 
All songs written by Paul Hayden Desser.

 "Bad as They Seem" – 3:31
 "In September" – 2:38
 "We Don't Mind" – 4:35
 "Tragedy" – 3:57
 "Stem" – 1:47
 "Skates" – 7:18
 "I'm to Blame" – 2:25
 "Assignment in Space with Rip Foster" – 2:37
 "Driveway" – 4:20
 "Hardly" – 4:13
 "You Were Loved" – 2:48
 "When This Is Over" – 4:00
 "My Parent's House" – 4:35
 "Lounging" – 4:27

Original track listing 
This is the track listing of the original 1995 Hardwood Records release, which is now out of print.

 "Bad as They Seem" – 4:34†
 "In September" – 2:38
 "We Don't Mind" – 4:35
 "Tragedy" – 3:57
 "Stem" – 1:47
 "Skates" – 7:18
 "I'm to Blame" – 2:25
 "Assignment in Space with Rip Foster" – 2:37
 "Driveway" – 4:20
 "Hardly" – 4:13
 "You Were Loved" – 2:48
 "When This Is Over" – 4:00
 "Bunkbed" – 4:14
 "I Almost Cried" – 3:33
 "My Parent's House" – 4:35
 "Lounging" – 4:27
 Kraft Dinner & Poledo's Club Sandwich (hidden track)

† As mentioned above, the original "Bad as They Seem" has one verse more than on subsequent releases

Personnel 
 Hayden – vocals, guitar (acoustic and electric), harmonica, piano, accordion
 producer (all tracks), mixing (all tracks)
 Joao Carvalho – drums on "Bad as They Seem", "Skates", "Driveway", "When This Is Over"; bass on "Bad as They Seem"
 producer (tracks 1, 6, 9, 12), mixing (1, 3–14), mastering (all tracks)
 Bryan Richards – drums on "In September"
 Guy Cannotplayit – cello on "Hardly"
 Blaine Johnson – mixing (track 2)

Release history

Notes 

Hayden (musician) albums
1995 albums
Sonic Unyon Records albums